Sir Charles Ritchie Burns  (27 May 1898 – 8 February 1985) was a New Zealand medical doctor and medical administrator. He was born in Blenheim, New Zealand, on 27 May 1898, and was educated at Marlborough High School, Nelson College and the University of Otago.

In the 1948 New Year Honours, Burns was appointed an Officer of the Order of the British Empire. He was promoted to Knight Commander of the same order in the 1958 Queen's Birthday Honours, for services to medicine.

References

1898 births
1985 deaths
20th-century New Zealand medical doctors
People educated at Nelson College
New Zealand Knights Commander of the Order of the British Empire
University of Otago alumni
New Zealand medical administrators
People educated at Marlborough Boys' College
People from Blenheim, New Zealand